Teymurabad may refer to the following places in Lorestan:

 Teymurabad, Pol-e Dokhtar
 Teymurabad, Selseleh